Akil Sadiki Patterson (born January 1, 1983) attended Frederick High School, Maryland, where he was an All-State Athlete in Football, Wrestling, and Track & Field as a shot-putter.  At the California University of Pennsylvania he was a two time Division-II All American. In 2006, he graduated with a B.S. in Sports Management.

Post-graduation

Patterson came from a wrestling family, and he wanted to try his hand at the sport once he graduated from college. As a former all-state heavyweight wrestler, Patterson began training as a Greco-Roman wrestler and joined the Terrapins wrestling team at the University of Maryland as a volunteer coach. He went on to lead the Terrapin Wrestling Club, which trains young athletes. He is also a four time Greco-Roman wrestling All-American, and a four time World Team Trials Qualifier.

In 2020 Mr. Patterson ran in the 13th district for the Baltimore City Council, but was unsuccessful in his bid.

LGBT advocacy

As the community affairs coordinator at :Athlete Ally, Patterson works with corporate partners, need based organizations, local organizations, campus programs and youth programs to coordinate their anti-discrimination initiatives. According to Doug Sanbourn, who serves as manager, community, commerce and partnership coordinator at :MillerCoors, they chose to work to Mr. Patterson "because of the work he has taken on as a leader. He embodies what we should all be doing to secure equality everywhere." Athlete Ally also provides training and outreach for collegiate and professional teams in addition to the NBA Draft Combine individual professional teams, and campus athletic departments. Athlete Ally actively reaches players, coaches, administration, and staff throughout sports in North America.

As a blogger for The Huffington Post, Patterson spreads the message of equality and allyship. In addition, he gives his interns and athletes a platform to share their stories in Huffington Post Voice-to-Voice Interviews.

Professional recognition

Patterson has been featured in The Advocate 40 under 40 issue. In addition, he has been featured in news media such as The Baltimore Sun, The Huffington Post, and The Washington Post.

References

External links
 

1983 births
Gay sportsmen
Living people
University of Maryland, College Park alumni
California University of Pennsylvania alumni
American LGBT sportspeople
LGBT players of American football
LGBT sport wrestlers
LGBT track and field athletes
21st-century LGBT people